The EEG and Clinical Neuroscience Society (ECNS) is an international scientific and educational organization dedicated to disseminating knowledge regarding the latest scientific advances in all fields of electrophysiology as they relate to the understanding, treatment, and prevention of neurobehavioral disorders.

ECNS publishes, in conjunction with SAGE Publishing, Clinical EEG and Neuroscience. Clinical EEG and Neuroscience conveys clinically relevant research and development in electroencephalography and neuroscience. The primary goal of ECNS is to further the clinical practice of classic electroencephalography (EEG), quantitative EEG (QEEG), evoked potentials, magnetoencephalography (MEG), electroconvulsive therapy (ECT), transcranial magnetic stimulation (TMS), deep brain stimulation (DBS), polysomnography (sleep EEG), and EEG neurofeedback from the professional, scientific, and economic standpoints.

History 
ECNS was formed as a result of merger between American Medical EEG Association (AMEEGA) and the American Psychiatric Electrophysiology Association (APEA).

Annual meeting 
ECNS has one major annual meeting which facilitates presentations of new scientific and clinical information, review symposia, and a review and discussion of medical economics as it pertains to ECNS members.

Presidents 
Presidents of the Society have included the following persons:

References

External links
 
 Annual Conference

Neuroscience organizations
Scientific societies based in the United States
Scientific organizations established in 1998
Medical associations based in the United States